The 2012 MLS Cup Playoffs was the seventeenth post-season tournament culminating the Major League Soccer regular season. The tournament began on October 31, and culminated on December 1, 2012 with MLS Cup 2012, the seventeenth league championship for MLS, won by the Los Angeles Galaxy 3-1 over Houston Dynamo. It was the second year that the playoffs included ten teams, and the first playoff series since 2006 in which teams cannot cross conference brackets. The top five teams in both the Eastern and Western conferences of the league earned berths, with the top three clubs in each conference earning direct byes to the conference semifinals. The fourth and fifth-place finishers of both conferences played in a single-elimination play-in match.

The play-in winner played their respective conference regular season champion in the conference semifinals, which was a two-leg aggregate series, without the away goals rule enforced. For the first time in MLS Cup Playoffs history, each Conference Championship was also a two-leg aggregate series, as opposed to the traditional single elimination match. The MLS Cup championship still remain a single match, but the team with the stronger regular season record, the Los Angeles Galaxy, hosting the final at their home venue.

Los Angeles Galaxy were the defending champions, having defeated Houston Dynamo 1–0 in last year's championship.

Both finalists directly entered the 2013–14 CONCACAF Champions League, with the champion earning a Pot A seed. They were joined by San Jose Earthquakes, the Supporters' Shield winner, and Sporting Kansas City, the 2012 U.S. Open Cup champion. However, none of these berths were available to the league's three Canadian teams, which instead participate in the Canadian Championship for that country's single berth in the CONCACAF Champions League.

Format 

For 2012, the league's previous system of "wild card" qualification—which had the potential for "crossover" series in which one team could play in the other conference's bracket—was scrapped. Instead, the top five teams in each conference will qualify for the playoffs and the two conference brackets are entirely separate. The First Round of each conference is a one-off match between the 4th and 5th place teams, similar to the previous wild card system, with the 4th-place team hosting. The First Round winner advances to play the conference's top seed in the Conference Semifinals.

Conference Semifinals and Conference Championship series are conducted in a home-and-away aggregate-goal format. The lower-seeded team in the Conference Semifinal hosts the first game, and the higher seed hosts the second. If the teams are tied after two games, a 30-minute extra time period (divided into two 15-minute periods) will be played followed by penalty kicks, if necessary. The away goals rule or golden goal is not used.

In the case of ties in the First Round and MLS Cup, extra time and penalty kicks are used in the same manner as above.

Qualification 

Eastern Conference

Western Conference

Tiebreak rules
When two or more teams are tied in standings on points the following tiebreak rules apply:

 Goals for
 Goal differential 
 Fewest disciplinary points in the official points table (foul – 1 pt, first yellow – 3 pts, second yellow – 5 pts, straight red – 6 pts, disciplinary commission suspension – 6 pts, etc.)
 Road goals
 Road goal differential
 Home goals
 Home goal differential
 Coin toss (2 teams) or drawing of lots (3 or more teams)

Bracket

Schedule

Knockout round

Conference Semifinals

Eastern Conference

Houston Dynamo won 2 – 1 on aggregate

D.C. United won 2 – 1 on aggregate.
Note: While D.C. United won the right to host the second leg as the higher seed, the order of the legs was reversed due to the effects of Hurricane Sandy. The second leg was originally scheduled for November 7 but was postponed one day due to snow.

Western Conference

Los Angeles Galaxy won 3 – 2 on aggregate

Seattle Sounders won 1 – 0 on aggregate

Conference Championships 

Houston Dynamo won 4 – 2 on aggregate

Los Angeles Galaxy won 4 – 2 on aggregate

MLS Cup

Post-season statistical leaders
Note: Statistics only for post-season games.

Top scorers

Most assists

See also 

 2012 in American soccer
 2012 Major League Soccer season
 2012 U.S. Open Cup

References 

2012